= Cestradoretus clypealis =

Scientific classification
- Kingdom: Animalia
- Phylum: Arthropoda
- Clade: Pancrustacea
- Class: Insecta
- Order: Coleoptera
- Suborder: Polyphaga
- Infraorder: Scarabaeiformia
- Family: Scarabaeidae
- Genus: Cestradoretus
- Species: C. clypealis

Binomial name
- Cestradoretus clypealis Frey, 1976

Species of beetle

Cestradoretus clypealis is a species of beetle of the family Scarabaeidae. It is found in Somalia.

== Description ==
Adults reach a length of about 5.5 mm (0.22 in). The upper and lower surfaces are yellowish-brown, with the nforehead dark brown to heather brown, and densely covered with medium-length white setae.
